The Mauricio Kagel Music Prize provided by the German arts foundation Kunststiftung NRW was established in 2011. The prize money is €50,000. Of the prize money, €30,000 goes to the prizewinner and €20,000 has to be used for an art project in North Rhine-Westphalia. The biennially prize recognizes interdisciplinary work in the spirit of German-Argentinean composer Mauricio Kagel and artistic experiments where music, image and performance meet.

Recipients
 2011 Georges Aperghis
 2013 Michel van der Aa
 2015 Rebecca Saunders
 2017 Simon Steen-Andersen

References

External links
 

German music awards
Awards established in 2011
Classical music awards